Emamzadeh or Emam Zadeh may refer to:

Emamzadeh District
Emam Zadeh, alternate name of Baba Zeyd, Lorestan
Emamzadeh-ye Kaka Reza
Emamzadeh Abazar
Emamzadeh, alternate name of Emamzadeh Ali, Fars, Iran
Emamzadeh, alternate name of Emam Qeys, Iran
Emamzadeh, alternate name of Sariyeh Khatun, Iran
Emamzadeh, Kermanshah
Emamzadeh, Kohgiluyeh and Boyer-Ahmad
Emamzadeh Deh Chal, a village in Markazi Province, Iran
Emamzadeh Qasem (disambiguation), various places in Iran
Emamzadeh, Qazvin, Iran
Emamzadeh, alternate name of Yaleh Gonbad, Iran
Emamzadeh Ala Eddin, Iran
Emamzadeh, West Azerbaijan

See also
Emamzadeh is a common element in Iranian place names; see